The 2011 FIM Mitas Czech Republic Speedway Grand Prix was the third race of the 2011 Speedway Grand Prix season. It took place on May 28 at the Markéta Stadium in Prague, Czech Republic.

Riders 
The Speedway Grand Prix Commission nominated Matěj Kůs as Wild Card, and Rafał Dobrucki and Lukáš Dryml both as Track Reserves. Dobrucki, seriously injured in the Polish Ekstraliga, will be replaced by Zdeněk Simota. The Draw was made on May 27 by Marie Kousalíková, Mayor of Prague 6 and Petr Svoboda, 2011 European Indoor 60 metres hurdles Champion.

 Draw 17.  Rafał Dobrucki →  Lukáš Dryml
 Draw 18.  Lukáš Dryml →  Zdeněk Simota

Results 
The Grand Prix was won by Greg Hancock who beat Jarosław Hampel, current World Champion Tomasz Gollob and Jason Crump. Hancock becoming World Championship leader.

Heat details

Heat after heat 
 (66,03) Holder, Jonsson, Lindbaeck, Holta
 (65,44) Gollob, Bjerre, Łaguta, Kołodziej
 (65,23) Crump, Pedersen, Lindgren, Harris (R)
 (65,03) Hancock, Hampel, Sajfutdinow, Kus
 (65,09) Hampel, Jonsson, Pedersen, Łaguta
 (65,66) Holder, Sajfutdinow, Harris, Kołodziej
 (65,34) Crump, Hancock, Bjerre, Holta
 (65,49) Gollob, Lindgren, Lindbaeck, Kus
 (67,03) Kus, Crump, Jonsson, Kołodziej
 (65,81) Hancock, Lindgren, Holder, Łaguta
 (65,85) Gollob, Pedersen, Holta, Sajfutdinow (X)
 (65,36) Hampel, Bjerre, Lindbaeck, Harris
 (66,27) Bjerre, Lindgren, Jonsson, Sajfutdinow
 (66,09) Hampel, Gollob, Crump, Holder
 (66,47) Holta, Harris, Łaguta, Kus
 (66,41) Hancock, Lindbaeck, Kołodziej, Pedersen
 (66,44) Hancock, Jonsson, Gollob, Harris
 (66,43) Pedersen, Holder, Bjerre, Kus
 (66,07) Holta, Hampel, Lindgren, Kołodziej
 (65,86) Sajfutdinow, Crump, Lindbaeck, Łaguta
 the Semi-Finals:
 (66,07) Hancock, Crump, Pedersen, Bjerre
 (66,33) Gollob, Hampel, Lindgren, Holder (Fx)
 the Final:
 (66,13) Hancock (6 points), Hampel (4), Gollob (2), Crump (0)

The intermediate classification

References

See also 
 motorcycle speedway

Speedway Grand Prix of Czech Republic
Czech
2011